National Workers' Union may refer to:
National Workers' Union (Dominica)
National Workers' Union (Guyana)
National Workers Union (Jamaica)
National Workers' Union (Saint Lucia)
National Workers' Union (Poland)
National Workers' Union (Trinidad & Tobago)